Sheila Ann Klinker is a Democratic politician who is currently a member of the Indiana House of Representatives, representing House District 27 since 1982.

Born in Indianapolis, Indiana, Klinker graduated from Purdue University with her Bachelor of Education in elementary education in 1961. Klinker later received her Master of Science from Purdue in 1970. Klinker worked her entire teaching career for the Lafayette School Corporation. She began her teaching career in 1961 at Klondike Elementary School in West Lafayette, Indiana while also teaching at Edgelea Elementary School. In 1963, Klinker began teaching at Miami Elementary School in Lafayette, Indiana, until 1985. Klinker was also the outreach liaison at the Purdue University College of Education.
 
Klinker currently serves on the House Committees for Agriculture and Rural Development, Education, and Ways and Means.

References

External links
 Official government website
https://iga.in.gov/legislative/2023/legislators/legislator_sheila_klinker_212/
Project Vote Smart - Representative Sheila Ann J. 'Shelia' Klinker (IN) profile
Follow the Money - Sheila Klinker
2008 2006 2004 2002 2000 1998 1996 1994 campaign contributions

Democratic Party members of the Indiana House of Representatives
1938 births
Living people
Politicians from Indianapolis
People from Lafayette, Indiana
Women state legislators in Indiana
Purdue University College of Education alumni
21st-century American politicians
21st-century American women politicians